The Menai Roosters Rugby League Football Club (also known as Menai District) is a rugby league football club that was formed in 1981 and competes in the Cronulla-Sutherland District Rugby Football League. The club is based out of Akuna Oval at Bangor where its clubhouse and headquarters are located and usually draws the large majority of its junior players from Menai and the surrounding suburbs of Bangor, Illawong, Alfords Point and Barden Ridge.

The Menai club currently field teams from Under 6 age groups all the way up to A Grade.

Notable players

See also

External links

LeagueNet Menai Roosters website

Rugby league teams in Sydney
Rugby clubs established in 1981
1981 establishments in Australia